Dieter Gieseler (10 January 1941 – 8 February 2008) was a  German cyclist. He won the silver medal in 1000m time trial in the 1960 Summer Olympics

References

External links
 
 

1941 births
2008 deaths
German male cyclists
German track cyclists
Olympic cyclists of the United Team of Germany
Cyclists at the 1960 Summer Olympics
Olympic silver medalists for the United Team of Germany
Olympic medalists in cycling
Sportspeople from Münster
Medalists at the 1960 Summer Olympics
Cyclists from North Rhine-Westphalia